The Kadiak KC-2 Speedster is an American single-seat, radial engined homebuilt biplane designed prior to World War II.

Design and development

The KC-2 was an original design of Everett E. David, built in 1931.

The aircraft was built with a welded steel tube fuselage, wooden wings, and fabric covering.

Operational history
The designer sold the KC-2 in 1939.  It was storm damaged post-war, rebuilt and re-licensed, remaining active until at least 1977.

Specifications

References

Homebuilt aircraft